Kamal Kishore Bhagat is an All Jharkhand Students Union politician who was a member of the Jharkhand Legislative Assembly for the Lohardaga constituency from 2009 to 2015. He was convicted and sentenced to seven-year rigorous imprisonment in a 1993 attempt to murder case.

References

Living people
Year of birth missing (living people)
Jharkhand MLAs 2009–2014
Jharkhand MLAs 2014–2019
Indian politicians convicted of crimes
Crime in Jharkhand
All Jharkhand Students Union politicians
Indian politicians disqualified from office